Silvânia is a municipality in southcentral Goiás state, Brazil.

History
Around 1774, it was discovered gold in the region. There was an influx of gold miners; with them, it was brought a statue of Nosso Senhor of Bonfim. It gave name for the small village that was created, Bonfim. It became a municipality in 1857. It was renamed to Silvânia in 1943, in a homage to a local Silva family .

Vianópolis, Leopoldo de Bulhões, São Miguel do Passa Quatro and Gameleira de Goiás were dismembered from Silvânia.

Location and highway connections
Silvânia is located 77 kilometers from the state capital of Goiânia, 180 km. from the national capital of Brasília, and 65 from the second most important city of the state, Anápolis.
The highways that link it with other cities are: GO-330, GO-010, GO-139 and GO-437.

Connections starting in Goiânia are made by BR-457 / GO-010 / Bonfinópolis / Leopoldo de Bulhões / GO-437 / GO-139.  See Sepin for all the distances.

It borders the municipalities of Gameleira de Goiás, Abadiânia and Alexânia to the north; Vianópolis, São Miguel do Passa Quatro and Bela Vista de Goiás to the south; Luziânia and Orizona to the east; Caldazinha and Leopoldo de Bulhões to the west.

The climate is tropical humid, with an average annual temperature of 23 °C.  The annual rainfall is 1,750 millimeters. The vegetation is 
cerrado or savanna.

Political information
Mayor: Geraldo Luiz Santana (January 2021-)
City council: 09
Eligible voters: 15,088 (November/2021)

Demographics
Population density: 8.14 inhabitants/km2 (2010)
Population in 1980: 19,809
Population in 2007: 18,370
Population in 2010: 19.089
Population in 2020 (estimated): 20.816
Urban population: 11,968 (2007)
Rural population: 6,502 (2007)
Population growth rate:  -0.19% 1996/2007

The economy
The main economic activities are dairy cattle and soybean growing.  Silvânia has large areas planted in soybeans and corn.  Brick making is also very important for the local economy.  Production is shipped to Goiânia and Brasília.

Industrial units: 34 (2007)
Commercial units: 159 (2007)
Dairy: Granja Leiteira Sol Dourado Ltda. - Coop. Agrop. dos Prod. Rurais de Silvânia (22/05/2006)
Financial institutions: Banco do Brasil S.A. - CEF - Banco Itaú S.A. (08/2007)
Cattle herd: 104,300 head (26,500 milk cows)
Main crops in 2006: cotton, rice, sweet potatoes, coffee, sugarcane, barley, beans (1,690 hectares), guava, oranges, manioc, corn (3,180 hectares), soybeans (50,000 hectares), and tomatoes.

Agricultural data 2006
Number of farms:  1,914
Total area:  176,952 ha.
Area of permanent crops: 1,471 ha.
Area of perennial crops: 58,498 ha.
Area of natural pasture:  79,473 ha. 
Area of woodland and forests:  34,114 ha. 
Persons dependent on farming:  1,632
Farms with tractors: 332
Number of tractors:  690
Cattle herd:  104,300 head IBGE

Education (2006)
Schools: 16
Total Students: 5,027
Middle school enrollment: 731
Higher education: Unidade Universitária da UEG
Adult literacy rate: 88.0% (2000) (national average was 86.4%)
Silvânia is home to two of the most important schools in the 20th century in Goiás, Instituto Auxiliadora and Ginásio Anchieta.

Health (2007)
Hospitals: 1
Hospital beds: 44
Ambulatory clinics: 10
Infant mortality rate: 12,5 (2019)

Human Development Index
MHDI:  0.709
State ranking:  47 (out of 246 municipalities)
National ranking:  904 (out of 5,507 municipalities)

Tourism and History
Silvânia has cultural attractions that are valuable for local and regional culture.  Monuments from the 18th century, century-old houses, possible archeological and remains of the bandeirante and Black colonizations are some of the attractions.  

There are some historical gold pits, like Roda, Batatal, Caixão, Coração, das Moças and das Velhas. 

It is one of the oldest cities of Goiás . Unlike many cities in the state of Goiás, Silvânia has a long history, beginning in 1774 when miners coming from Santa Luzia, present-day Luziânia, found gold in the region.  Soon a small settlement, called Bonfim, was established.  In 1943 Bonfim was renamed to Silvânia in tribute to a local figure, Vicente Miguel da Silva.

See also 
List of municipalities in Goiás
Microregions of Goiás

References

Frigoletto
 Sepin

Municipalities in Goiás
Populated places established in 1774